Bathytoma helenae is a species of sea snail, a marine gastropod mollusk in the family Borsoniidae.

Description
The shell reaches a length of 50 mm.

Distribution
This marine species occurs off KwaZuluNatal, South Africa.

References

 Kilburn, R.N. (1974) Taxonomic notes on South African marine Mollusca (3): Gastropoda: Prosobranchia, with descriptions of new taxa of Naticidae, Fasciolariidae, Magilidae, Volutomitridae and Turridae. Annals of the Natal Museum, 22, 187–220.

External links

 

Endemic fauna of South Africa
helenae
Gastropods described in 1974